Kagyu Thekchen Ling Monastery, also known as Ratnarishi Bihar Buddhist Gumpa or simply Lava Monastery, is a Buddhist monastery situated in Lava, West Bengal, India.

History 
In the 1980s, the local Buddhist community of Lava offered Karma Lodrö Chökyi Senge (1954–1992), the 3rd Jamgon Kongtrul Rinpoche, four acres of land to establish a Buddhist monastery in the hamlet, with the aim of preserving local religious and cultural tradition. The offer was accepted in 1987 and construction work commenced in April, 1988. The monastery was opened on June 6, 1990, on the occasion of Chökhor Düchen.

In 2001, the Dalai Lama opened Mane Lhakhang, a community temple next to the monastery. Today, over a hundred monks practise Buddhist philosophy at the monastery.

Location 
The monastery is located in Lava, Kalimpong district in the Indian state of West Bengal. It sits just beside the Neora Reservoir, and serves as a gateway to the Neora Valley National Park. It is at a distance of about 32 km (19.9 mi) from Kalimpong. The nearest railway station is New Jalpaiguri Junction railway station and the nearest airport is Bagdogra Airport in Bagdogra, Siliguri.

Description 
The monastery resembles elements and styles of Tibetan architecture, and is built of brick and concrete. It has several prayer halls, lawns, sitting areas, and houses a large Buddha statue. It is properly maintained.

Gallery

References 

Buddhist monasteries in West Bengal
1990 establishments in West Bengal
Tourist attractions in Kalimpong district
Tibetan Buddhist monasteries and temples in India